The large Indian civet (Viverra zibetha) is a viverrid native to South and Southeast Asia. It is listed as Least Concern on the IUCN Red List. The global population is considered decreasing mainly because of trapping-driven declines in heavily hunted and fragmented areas, notably in China, and the heavy trade as wild meat.

Characteristics 

The large Indian civet is grey or tawny and has a black spinal stripe running from behind the shoulders to the root of the tail. The front of the muzzle has a whitish patch emphasized by blackish behind on each side. The chin and fore throat are blackish. The sides and lower surface of the neck are banded with black stripes and white spaces in between. The tail has a variable number of complete black and white rings. Its claws are retractable. The soles of the feet are hairy.

As indicated by its common name, this is a relatively large civet, almost certainly the largest of the Viverra species and exceeded in size among the Viverridae family only by African civets and binturongs. The hind foot measures .

Distribution and habitat
The large Indian civet ranges from Nepal, northeast India, Bhutan, Bangladesh to Myanmar, Thailand, the Malay peninsula and Singapore to Cambodia, Laos, Vietnam and China.

In China, the wild large Indian civet population declined drastically by 94–99% since the 1950s following deforestation, due to hunting for the fur trade, use of its musk glands as medicine and for the perfume industry. By the 1990s, it was largely confined to the north of Guangdong Province in southern China, but has not been recorded in Hainan Island during surveys between 1998 and 2008.

Ecology and behaviour 

The large Indian civet is solitary and nocturnal. It spends most of the time on the ground. Its diet includes fish, birds, lizards, frogs, insects, scorpions and other arthropods, crabs, as well as poultry and rubbish.
Little is known about its breeding behaviour. It is thought that it breeds throughout the year and has two litters per year, with two to four young per litter.

Conservation
Viverra zibetha is totally protected in Malaysia under the Wildlife Protection Act of 1972 and listed on Category II of the China Wildlife Protection Law. China listed it as ‘Endangered’ under criteria A2acd, and it is a class II protected State species (due to trapping for food and scent glands). It is protected in Thailand, Vietnam and Myanmar. It is found in several protected areas throughout its range. The population of India is listed on CITES Appendix III.

In Hong Kong, it is a protected species under the Wild Animals Protection Ordinance Cap 170, though it has not been recorded in a natural state in Hong Kong since the 1970s, and is considered extirpated.

Taxonomy 

Viverra zibetha was the scientific name for the large Indian civet introduced by Carl Linnaeus in 1758.
Several naturalists proposed species and subspecies in the 19th and 20th centuries, of which the following were recognised as valid subspecies by 2005:
 V. z. zibetha is the nominate subspecies and thought to occur from Nepal eastwards to Assam.
Viverra ashtoni described by Robert Swinhoe in 1864 was a skin of an individual that was shot near the upper Min River in China's Fujian Province; occurs in China.
V. z. picta described by Robert Charles Wroughton in 1915 was based on two skins from the vicinity of Hkamti by the upper Chindwin River in Myanmar; occurs from Assam and northern Myanmar to Indochina.
V. z. pruinosa also described by Wroughton in 1915 was a skin of an adult male large Indian civet from Myanmar's Tanintharyi Region; occurs from southern Myanmar to Peninsular Malaysia.
V. z. hainana described by Ying-Xiang Wang and Xu in 1983 from Hainan Island.
The validity of Viverra tainguensis described in 1997 by Sokolov, Rozhnov and Pham Chong from Tây Nguyên in Gia Lai Province in Vietnam has been seriously questioned, and it is now generally considered a synonym of V. zibetha.

Local names 

In Uttar Pradesh (Ballia ) it is called 'Khatwas'..
In Bengali it is called Bham or Gondho Gokul.
In Assamese it is called Haga Gendera.
In Malay language it is called Musang kasturi (musang = civet, kasturi = musk), due to its musky smell.
In Thai, it is called chamot phaeng hang plong (ชะมดแผงหางปล้อง; ; lit. "circular tailed/maned genet")
In Lao, it is called ngen phaeng hang kan (ເຫງັນແຜງຫາງກ່ານ; ; lit. "stripe-tailed/maned civet")
In Malayalam it is called 'Veruku' (വെരുക്)

References

External links 

Mammals of Southeast Asia
Mammals of Nepal
Mammals of India
Mammals of Bangladesh
Fauna of Hong Kong
Mammals described in 1758
Taxa named by Carl Linnaeus
Carnivorans of Malaysia
Mammals of Singapore